Science and Hypothesis is a book by French mathematician Henri Poincaré, first published in 1902. Aimed at a non-specialist readership, it deals with mathematics, space, physics and nature. It puts forward the theses that absolute truth in science is unattainable, and that many commonly held beliefs of scientists are held as convenient conventions rather than because they are more valid than the alternatives.

In this book, Poincaré describes open scientific questions regarding the photo-electric effect, Brownian motion, and the relativity of physical laws in space.
Reading this book inspired Albert Einstein's subsequent Annus Mirabilis papers published in 1905.

A new translation was published in November 2017.

References 

1902 non-fiction books
Popular science books
Mathematics books
French non-fiction books